Gyrodactylus flavescensis is a species of monogenean ectoparasites. It was found in Gobiusculus flavescens in European coastal waters.

See also 
 Gyrodactylus gondae
 Gyrodactylus arcuatoides
 Gyrodactylus branchialis

References 

Animal parasites of fish
Gyrodactylus
Animals described in 2004